SS Baychimo was a steel-hulled 1,322 ton cargo steamer built in 1914 in Sweden and owned by the Hudson's Bay Company, used to trade provisions for pelts in Inuit settlements along the Victoria Island coast of the Northwest Territories of Canada. She became a notable ghost ship along the Alaska coast, being abandoned in 1931 and seen numerous times since then until her last sighting in 1969.

Early history
The Baychimo was launched in 1914 as the Ångermanelfven (Yard No 420) by the Lindholmens shipyard (Lindholmens Mekaniska Verkstad A/B) in Gothenburg, Sweden, for the Baltische Reederei GmbH of Hamburg. The Ångermanelfven was used on trading routes between Hamburg and Sweden until the First World War. After World War I she was passed to the United Kingdom as part of the reparations by Germany for shipping losses and acquired by the Hudson's Bay Company in 1921. Renamed Baychimo and based in Ardrossan, Scotland, she completed nine successful voyages along the north coast of Canada, visiting trading posts and collecting pelts.

Abandonment
On October 1, 1931, at the end of a trading run and loaded with a cargo of fur, Baychimo became trapped in pack ice. The crew briefly abandoned the ship, traveling over a half-mile of ice to the town of Barrow to take shelter for two days, but the ship had broken free of the ice by the time the crew returned. The ship became mired again on October 8, more thoroughly this time, and on October 15 the Hudson's Bay Company sent aircraft to retrieve 22 of the crew. 15 crew remained behind, intending to wait out the winter if necessary, and they constructed a wooden shelter some distance away. On November 24 a powerful blizzard struck, and after it abated there was no sign of the Baychimo; the skipper concluded that she must have broken up and sunk in the storm. The 15 men proceeded to track the ship down and, deciding that the ship was unlikely to survive the winter, retrieved the most valuable furs from the hold to transport by air. The Baychimo was abandoned.

Ghost ship
The Baychimo did not sink, and over the next several decades there were numerous sightings of the ship. People managed to board her several times, but each time they were either unequipped to salvage the ship or driven away by bad weather. The last recorded sighting of the Baychimo was by a group of Inuit in 1969, 38 years after she was abandoned. She was stuck fast in the pack ice of the Beaufort Sea between Point Barrow and Icy Cape in the Chukchi Sea off the northwestern Alaskan coast. Baychimo's ultimate fate is unknown and is presumed sunk.

Sightings
 In March of the following year, she was seen floating peacefully near the shore by Leslie Melvin, a man traveling to Nome with his dog sled team.
 A few months after that, she was seen by a company of prospectors.
 March 1933, she was found by a group of Iñupiat who boarded her and were trapped aboard for 10 days by a freak storm.
 August 1933, the Hudson's Bay Company heard she was still afloat, but was too far asea to salvage.
 July 1934, she was boarded by a group of explorers on a schooner.
 September 1935, she was seen off the Alaskan coast.
 November 1939, she was boarded by Captain Hugh Polson, wishing to salvage her, but the creeping ice floes intervened and the captain had to abandon her.
 After 1939, she was seen floating alone and without crew numerous times, but had always eluded capture.
 March 1962, she was seen sailing along the Beaufort Sea coast by a group of Inuit.
 She was found frozen in an ice pack in 1969, 38 years after she was abandoned. This is the last recorded sighting of the Baychimo.
 In 2006, the Alaskan government began work on a project to solve the mystery of "the Ghost Ship of the Arctic" and locate the Baychimo, whether still afloat or on the ocean floor. She has not been found yet.

In education
"Alaska's Phantom Ship", an article about the vessel, was printed in the textbook Galaxies (Houghton Mifflin: Boston, 1971, 1974 p. 180.)

References
Notes

Bibliography
 Gunston, David, UNESCO Courier, Aug–Sept 1991

Further reading
 Dalton, Anthony, Baychimo: Arctic Ghost Ship, Heritage House, 2006, 
 Gillingham, Donald W., Umiak!, Museum Press, 1955

World War I merchant ships of Canada
Ships built in Gothenburg
Shipwrecks in the Arctic Ocean
Ghost ships
Maritime incidents in 1931
1914 ships
Missing ships